Kangxi Dynasty is a 2001 Chinese television series based on the novel Kangxi Da Di (康熙大帝; The Great Kangxi Emperor) by Eryue He. The series is a prequel to the 1997 television series Yongzheng Dynasty, and was followed by Qianlong Dynasty in 2002.

Plot
The series focuses on the major events which occurred during the reign of the Kangxi Emperor in the Qing dynasty. These include the power struggle with Oboi, the Revolt of the Three Feudatories, and the campaign against the Kingdom of Tungning.

Cast

 Chen Daoming as the Kangxi Emperor
 Li Nan as the Kangxi Emperor (teenager)
 Chen Weizhen as the Kangxi Emperor (child)
 Siqin Gaowa as Empress Dowager Xiaozhuang
 Gao Lancun as Mingzhu
 Xue Zhongrui as Songgotu
 Li Jianqun as Consort Rong
 Ru Ping as Sumalagu
 Hu Shanshan as Sumalagu (young)
 Hu Tiange as Lanqi'er
 Liao Jingsheng as Li Guangdi
 An Yaping as Wei Dongting
 Liu Ting as Wei Dongting (young)
 Li Hongtao as Galdan Boshugtu Khan
 Liu Dayin as Zheng Jing
 Lu Yong as Yang Qilong
 Cao Yongxiang as Wu Sangui
 Su Tingshi as Yao Qisheng
 Hou Yongsheng as Shi Lang
 Liu Jun as the Shunzhi Emperor
 Yao Chang'an as Oboi
 Zhu Yidan as Sonin
 Gao Tianhao as Yinzhi
 Wan Zhongliang as Yinreng
 Song Laiyun as Ebilun
 Liu Yubin as Zhu Guozhi
 Ma Xiaomao as Wu Yingxiong
 Bo Hong as Consort Donggo
 Zhu Yan as Consort Tunggiya
 Gong Xuehua as Consort Hui
 Tang Ruli as Ziyun
 Zhang Jingjing as Hongyu
 Li Chentao as Empress Hešeri
 Wang Yetian as Baori Longmei
 Zhang Guangzheng as Suksaha
 Li Ruping as Banbu Ershan
 Li Ming as Zhou Peigong
 Gao Liang as Wu Ciyou
 Hao Tienan as Tuhai
 Cui Dai as Wang Fuchen
 Zhao Kai as Wang Jizhen
 Bai Yang as Zhang Tingyu
 Chen Bin as Chen Tingjing
 Xue Yan as Xiaomaozi
 Ma Jie as Huang Jing
 Liu Kui as Wu Liangfu
 Chen Dazhong as Wei Chengmo
 Tong Xiaohu as Li Dequan
 Li Xiaolei as Xingsen
 Zhou Qi as Ji Shi
 Zhao Jingwen as Ge Li
 Guan Dejun as Zheng Tai
 Ren Chao as Feng Xifan
 Zhang Suguo as Liu Guoxuan
 Liu Changsheng as Yulinxiu
 Hao Tienan as Wu Liuyi

Production
The series was partially produced on location at the House of the Huangcheng Chancellor in rural Shanxi, the home of Chen Tingjing, a minister of the Kangxi Emperor who served as the chief editor for his dictionary.

Awards

Kangxi Dynasty won the Outstanding Drama award at the 20th Golden Eagle Television Awards in 2002.

Reception

Although the series was generally popular, it received lower ratings than its predecessor, Yongzheng Dynasty, a similar television series about the Kangxi Emperor's son and successor, the Yongzheng Emperor. The series was criticised by some for being wrought with historical inaccuracies. Critics also pointed out its unnecessary emphasis on Taiwan, a contemporary issue. Some major events during Kangxi's reign were omitted, such as his contributions to the Chinese language with the Kangxi Dictionary, and the contention for the succession among Kangxi's sons, which is featured more prominently in Yongzheng Dynasty.

References

External links
 
  Kangxi Dynasty on Sina.com

2001 Chinese television series debuts
Television series set in the Qing dynasty
Mandarin-language television shows
Television shows based on Chinese novels
Chinese historical television series
Television shows written by Zhu Sujin